Andrzej Przewoźnik (13 May 1963 – 10 April 2010) was a Polish historian who served as Secretary of the Council for the Protection of Struggle and Martyrdom Sites. He died in the 2010 Polish Air Force Tu-154 crash near the city of Smolensk, Russia.

Przewoźnik was listed on the flight manifest of the plane which belonged to the 36th Special Aviation Regiment carrying the President of Poland Lech Kaczyński. The plane crashed at the Smolensk-North airport in Pechersk, near Smolensk, on 10 April 2010, killing all on board.

Awards

 Grand Cross of the Order of Polonia Restituta (2010, posthumously; previously awarded the Officer's Cross)
 Gloria Artis Gold Medal (2010, posthumous)
 Commander's Cross of the Order of St. Gregory the Great
 Officer's Cross of the Order of Merit of the Republic of Hungary
 Silver Cross of the Polish Combatants Association in London
 Order of Friendship (Russia)
 Medal Milito Pro Christo (2001)
 Diploma "Benemerenti", given by the Bishop Field Army Maj.-Gen. Sławoj Leszek (2001)

References 

 
 
 

1963 births
2010 deaths
People from Nowy Dwór Mazowiecki County
Victims of the Smolensk air disaster
20th-century Polish historians
Polish male non-fiction writers
Jagiellonian University alumni
Grand Crosses of the Order of Polonia Restituta
Recipients of the Gold Medal for Merit to Culture – Gloria Artis
Knights Commander of the Order of St Gregory the Great
Officer's Crosses of the Order of Merit of the Republic of Hungary (civil)
21st-century Polish historians